Theresia Kiesl (born 26 October 1963, in Sarleinsbach) is a retired Austrian middle distance runner who specialized in the 1500 metres. She was implicated in a 2006 doping scandal which also involved Stefan Matschiner, a friend of her husband; doping was confiscated in her home in 2007.

Achievements

Personal bests
800 metres - 2:00.75 min (1993)
1500 metres - 4:03.02 min (1996) - Austrian record
3000 metres - 8:55.56 min (1993) - Austrian record

References

External links

1963 births
Living people
Austrian female middle-distance runners
Athletes (track and field) at the 1992 Summer Olympics
Athletes (track and field) at the 1996 Summer Olympics
Olympic athletes of Austria
Olympic bronze medalists for Austria
Medalists at the 1996 Summer Olympics
Olympic bronze medalists in athletics (track and field)
People from Rohrbach District
Sportspeople from Upper Austria